Sheridan School is an independent, co-ed, progressive, K-8 school in Washington, D.C. The school enrolls approximately 225 students. The average tuition for the 2020-2021 school year is $39,095. The school awarded $1.6 million in financial aid in 2020-2021. Forty percent (40%) of Sheridan students are students of color.

History 
Founded in 1927 as Mrs. Cook's School, Sheridan School was later renamed after its original location of Sheridan Circle on Embassy Row. Incorporated as a non-profit in 1961, it moved two years later to its current location on 36th Street, NW, in the North Cleveland Park neighborhood. In 1971, the school purchased a 130-acre Mountain Campus in Luray, Virginia.

Mountain campus 

The school also has a 130-acre Mountain Campus in Luray, Virginia, in the foothills of the Blue Ridge Mountains.  This facility includes: platform tents, a dining hall, and a nature center. Activities include a zip line, a giant swing, a climbing wall and a high- and low-ropes courses. Each grade engages in the outdoor education program twice each school year.

Notable alumnus  
 Al Gore, former Vice President of the United States, attended Sheridan from kindergarten to third grade.
 Eva Jinek, Dutch American journalist and television presenter

References

External links 
 Official website

Private elementary schools in Washington, D.C.
Private middle schools in Washington, D.C.
Educational institutions established in 1927
North Cleveland Park
1927 establishments in Washington, D.C.